National Highway 39 (NH 39) is a  National Highway in India. This highway passes through the Indian states of Madhya Pradesh, Uttar Pradesh and Jharkhand.

Route
This  highway passes through Jhansi, Chhatarpur, Panna, Satna, Rewa, Sidhi, Singrauli,  Renukut, Shaktinagar, and some major town in Jharkhand

The 262 km stretch in Jharkhand starts from bilaspur village,  Garhwa , connecting NH-139 in Daltonganj, then passes through Latehar, connecting  NH-22 at Chandwa, connecting  NH-143A in Kuru, Lohardaga then passes through Chanho, Mandar, Ratu, and finally ends at Ring Road, Tupudana, Ranchi

See also 
 List of National Highways in India
 List of National Highways in India (by Highway Number)
 National Highways Development Project

References

External links
 NH 39 on OpenStreetMap

National highways in India
National Highways in Uttar Pradesh
National Highways in Madhya Pradesh
National Highways in Jharkhand
Transport in Jhansi
Transport in Ranchi